Campbell County is a United States county situated in the south central part of the Commonwealth of Virginia.  Located in the Piedmont region of Virginia, Campbell borders the Blue Ridge Mountains.  The county seat is Rustburg.

Grounded on a tobacco cash crop economy, Campbell County was created in 1782 from part of Bedford County.  The county was named in honor of General William Campbell, hero of the American Revolutionary War.

Campbell County is part of the Lynchburg, VA Metropolitan Statistical Area. At the 2020 census, the county population was 55,696.  The number of residents has grown steadily in every census after 1930, and the total population has more than doubled since that time.

Lynchburg was established in Campbell County in 1786, incorporated as a town in 1805, and separated from Campbell County when it became an independent city in 1852. Lynchburg has annexed additional land from Bedford County and Campbell County through the years, most recently in 1976.

History 

The Native American tribes of the Monacan, Iroquois, and Cherokee were the original inhabitants of the Campbell County area, but were later forced west due to the settlers' progress. Governor William Gooch in 1727 created a couple of "inducements" in order to lure settlers to the Campbell County area. These inducements were that if one settled on the Staunton River "in the bounds of the newly formed County of Brunswick" then they would be freed from paying levies for ten years. The second "inducement" was that the settler could claim 400 acres simply by building a cabin on the land and by "planting a patch of grain".

The inducement's attempt to draw settlers was not vastly successful with the exception of a few new settlers, and the Governor soon took mention of his inducements to the ocean ports in which immigrants were arriving in America, as well as to the ports back in their homelands. This great difficulty in gaining new settlers for Campbell County is one of the reasons that the Governor allowed the Scotch-Irish immigrants with Presbyterian beliefs to gain religious freedom, in order to secure as many new settlers as possible for the newly founded county.

The area that would become Campbell County was first settled by Europeans, initially Scotch-Irish Presbyterians, in the late 1730s.  After nearly fifty years of immigration and development, the newly formed county was established in 1782 from part of Bedford County , and was the first county formed after the American Revolution. Campbell County was named for Revolutionary War hero, General William Campbell, who is known for the 1780 Battle of Kings Mountain.  The independent city of Lynchburg, Virginia was subsequently formed from the county's land in 1786.

Jeremiah Rust donated the land that would become the county's seat named Rustburg. The towns of Altavista and Brookneal were created due to their business advantages as well as the "intersection of trails". Altavista was planned by a group of businessmen in 1907, due to its "strategic" location and "potential" as a new location for a railroad.

From its earliest days, the county relied on tobacco as the primary cash crop and basis for the economy, though it also developed early manufacturing operations. Brookneal, with its strategic location on the Staunton River, was long an important tobacco and textile hub.  However, the departure of manufacturing and the changing tobacco market has forced Campbell to transform from a mainly agricultural area into a mixture of suburban and rural communities. Campbell County was also an iron manufacturer and begun operations Pre-Revolutionary War and continued operations in Oxford Iron Works until it was closed in 1875. The building is still standing today.

Campbell County opened its first public school in 1871 after the Civil War. In 1878, Campbell County and Lynchburg became two separate entities when Lynchburg was recognized as an independent city. The first school fair was held in Rustburg, the county seat, in 1908. This was the first school fair ever held in Virginia and was started by the Virginia Federation of Women's Club, "with the aid of J.S. Thomas, then school examiner in the district, and with the agreement of the Van Dyke League to help in Campbell." This fair was a showcase of "expert knowledge and training," as well as each child's best work.

Campbell County and its residents have participated and given aid in many wars. They have had soldiers involved in the American Revolution, Civil War, World War I, World War II, the Korean War, Vietnam War, Gulf War, and the War in Afghanistan, War in Iraq.

Religion 
Campbell County's religious origin predominantly included Protestant Christianity, with denominations such as Quakerism and Presbyterianism strongly represented. Early religious adherents sought religious freedom. They migrated from many places, but most migrated from Colonial Williamsburg and surrounding areas where the Episcopal Church hampered the practice of other religions.

The Quakers gained a foothold within the Campbell County area due to Sarah Clark Lynch, wife of Charles Lynch, the founder of the ferry boat service across the James River and mother of John Lynch, the founder of Lynchburg. Due to Sarah Lynch's influence their application for a meeting house was approved, and the South River Friends Meeting House was built. The Quakers later migrated from the area due to disagreements with the other Campbell County populace over issues such as slavery and the American Revolution. The Quakers maintained pacifist beliefs and during the American Revolution they espoused a standpoint of neutrality and stated that warfare went against their belief system. This apparent refusal to aid their neighbors in their fight for independence greatly angered many and created a wedge between the Quakers and the Non-Quakers. The Quakers also adamantly believed in the abolition of slavery and preached how the institution was wrong and should be disallowed. In 1817 they freed all of their slaves. These actions created additional tension with their slave-holding neighbors and caused many Quakers to leave the Campbell County area and to move West.

The Presbyterian religious faction mainly consisted of Scotch-Irish who originally came to America in order to gain religious freedom from the "Established Church in Ireland" and to create a better life for themselves. They originally settled in Pennsylvania, but then moved to Virginia due to Governor Gooch's inducements to entice settlers to come to Campbell County. The Presbyterians and their descendants then remained in Campbell County, and others who had been with them on the trip to America soon followed after, greatly aiding in the settlement process.

Geography

Adjacent counties / Independent city
Lynchburg, Virginia – northwest (independent city)
Amherst County, Virginia – north
Appomattox County, Virginia – northeast
Charlotte County, Virginia – east
Halifax County, Virginia – southeast
Pittsylvania County, Virginia – southwest
Bedford County, Virginia – west

Major Highways

Demographics

2020 census

Note: the US Census treats Hispanic/Latino as an ethnic category. This table excludes Latinos from the racial categories and assigns them to a separate category. Hispanics/Latinos can be of any race.

2000 Census
As of the census of 2000, there were 51,078 people, 20,639 households, and 14,694 families residing in the county.  The population density was 101 people per square mile (39/km2).  There were 22,088 housing units at an average density of 44 per square mile (17/km2).  The racial makeup of the county was 83.24% White, 14.71% Black or African American, 0.19% Native American, 0.62% Asian, 0.01% Pacific Islander, 0.33% from other races, and 0.90% from two or more races.  0.83% of the population were Hispanic or Latino of any race.

There were 20,639 households, out of which 30.80% had children under the age of 18 living with them, 56.00% were married couples living together, 11.40% had a female householder with no husband present, and 28.80% were non-families. 24.60% of all households were made up of individuals, and 8.80% had someone living alone who was 65 years of age or older.  The average household size was 2.45 and the average family size was 2.91.

In the county, the population was spread out, with 24.00% under the age of 18, 7.70% from 18 to 24, 29.30% from 25 to 44, 25.60% from 45 to 64, and 13.50% who were 65 years of age or older.  The median age was 38 years. For every 100 females there were 95.30 males.  For every 100 females age 18 and over, there were 92.30 males.

The median income for a household in the county was $37,280, and the median income for a family was $42,901. Males had a median income of $32,108 versus $22,286 for females. The per capita income for the county was $18,134.  About 7.90% of families and 10.60% of the population were below the poverty line, including 14.10% of those under age 18 and 10.90% of those age 65 or over.

Government

Board of Supervisors
Altavista district: Mr. A. Dale Moore
Brookneal district: Mr. Charlie Watts (I)
Concord district: Mr. Matt Cline
Rustburg district: Mr. Jonathan Hardie (I)
Spring Hill district: Mr. Kenny Brown
Sunburst district: Mr. Steve Shockley
Timberlake district: Ms. Susan Hogg (I)

Constitutional officers
Clerk of the Circuit Court: Valerie Younger (I)
Commissioner of the Revenue: Calvin Massie (R)
Commonwealth's Attorney: Paul McAndrews (I)
Sheriff: Winston W. Clark, III (I)
Treasurer: Robin Jefferson (R)

Campbell County is represented by Republicans Frank M. Ruff, Jr. and Stephen D. "Steve" Newman in the Virginia Senate, Republicans Kathy J. Byron, C. Matt Fariss, and James E. Edmunds, II in the Virginia House of Delegates, and Republican Bob Good in the U.S. House of Representatives.

Communities

Towns
Altavista
Brookneal

Census-designated places
Concord
Forest
Rustburg
Timberlake

Other unincorporated communities
Castle Craig
Evington
Gladys
Kingston
Long Island
Lynch Station

Some of these unincorporated areas have Lynchburg mailing addresses.

Sports and recreation 

Campbell County is home to sporting events and organizations including:
 Altavista High School Sports
 Altavista YMCA
 Brookville Bees Youth Athletic Association - Nonprofit organization providing recreational Football and Basketball for area youth.
 Brookville High School Sports
 Brookville Soccer Club - Nonprofit organization providing recreational Soccer for area youth.
 Campbell County Parks & Recreation
 Hiking areas include Timbrook Park.
 Rustburg High School Sports
 Timber Lake - Fishing, Paddle boating, Swimming
 Timberlake Dixie Youth
 William Campbell High School Sports

See also
National Register of Historic Places listings in Campbell County, Virginia
Campbell County Public Schools (Virginia)

References

 
Virginia counties
1782 establishments in Virginia
Counties on the James River (Virginia)
Populated places established in 1782